"Mr. Gorgeous (and Miss Curvaceous)" is a 1997 hit by English electronic group Smoke City. Written by the three group members and produced by the group with Mike Nielsen, the song did not experience worldwide success like their debut single, "Underwater Love", but did become a number-one hit in Italy in September 1997.

Critical reception
British magazine Music Week rated "Mr. Gorgeous (and Miss Curvaceous)" three out of five, describing it as "a dreamy, jazzy acoustic guitar-based tune. Its naggingly insistent "aye-aye-aye" chorus plus Mood II Swing and Hyperspace mixes make it a strong contender." Daisy & Havoc from RM gave it five out of five. They added, "Smoke City cope with the difficult follow-up to a hit single very well here by chooslng this cheeky irresistible little summer number as the next move after 'Underwater Love'. Guitars are astrumming and the vocal is excellent–watch out for the singlalong "ay ay ay" chorus..."

Track listings
 UK cassette single
 "Mr. Gorgeous (and Miss Curvaceous)" (radio edit) – 4:05
 "Mr. Gorgeous (and Miss Curvaceous)" (Mood II Swing vocal mix) – 9:20

 UK and Italian maxi-CD single
 "Mr. Gorgeous (and Miss Curvaceous)" (radio edit) – 4:05
 "Mr. Gorgeous (and Miss Curvaceous)" (Hyperspace dub) – 5:35
 "Mr. Gorgeous (and Miss Curvaceous)" (Mood II Swing vocal mix) – 9:20
 "Numbers" – 4:21

 Italian 12-inch vinyl
A1. "Mr. Gorgeous (and Miss Curvaceous)" (LP version) – 4:20
A2. "Numbers" – 4:21
B1. "Mr. Gorgeous (and Miss Curvaceous)" (Mood II Swing vocal mix) – 9:20
B2. "Mr. Gorgeous (and Miss Curvaceous)" (Hyperspace dub) – 5:35

Personnel
Personnel are adapted from the UK maxi-CD single liner notes.
 Smoke City – production
 Marc Brown – writing
 Chris Franck – writing
 Nina Miranda – writing, artwork design
 Phil Hartley – bassoon
 Mike Nielsen – extra backing vocals, production, recording engineer
 Toni Economides – extra backing vocals, programming
 Paul Mouzouros – extra backing vocals
 Ben Hillier – mixing
 Zombart (UK) AK – artwork design
 Dave Hindley – photography

Charts

References

1997 songs
1997 singles
Jive Records singles
Number-one singles in Italy
Virgin Records singles